The 1976–77 Israel State Cup (Gvia HaMedina) was the 38th season of Israel's nationwide football cup competition and the 23rd after the Israeli Declaration of Independence.

The competition was won by Maccabi Tel Aviv, who have beaten Beitar Tel Aviv 1–0 at the final.

Results

Fourth Round

Byes: Hapoel Aliyah Kfar Saba, Hapoel Azor, Hapoel Beit Shemesh, Hapoel HaTzair Haifa, Hapoel Migdal HaEmek, Hapoel Nahariya, Maccabi Be'er Sheva, Maccabi Herzliya, Sektzia Ma'alot, SK Nes Tziona.

Fifth Round

Sixth Round

Round of 16

Quarter-finals

Semi-finals

Final

References
100 Years of Football 1906–2006, Elisha Shohat (Israel), 2006, p. 241
Cup (Pages 6-7) Hadshot HaSport, 12.12.1976, archive.football.co.il 
Cup (Pages 6-7) Hadshot HaSport, 23.1.1977, archive.football.co.il 
Cup (Page 2) Hadshot HaSport, 26.1.1977, archive.football.co.il 
Cup (Page 2) Hadshot HaSport, 2.2.1977, archive.football.co.il 
Cup (Pages 2-3) Hadshot HaSport, 3.2.1977, archive.football.co.il 

Israel State Cup
State Cup
Israel State Cup seasons